This article covers the third series of the MegaMan NT Warrior anime series, known in Japan as . Like Axess, Stream consists of only one part with 51 episodes. Currently, there are no plans for an English adaptation of the series, but they did reuse some background elements in MegaMan Star Force.

Stream premiered in Japan on October 2, 2004, exactly one week after Axess concluded. It ran until September 24, 2005. Midway through the series, the 50-minute feature film Rockman EXE: Program of Light and Dark premiered in Japanese theaters on March 12, 2005. The movie would directly connect with the events in Stream and is necessary for understanding the full plot of the series.

The title Stream is meant to describe the flow of one storyline into the next, and this holds true as Stream picks up immediately where Axess left off. In relation to the Mega Man Battle Network video games, Stream uses many prominent characters and concepts from Battle Network 5, though it still borrows elements from various previous Battle Network titles, especially Battle Network 4.

Episode list

The Program of Light and Darkness
There is no official confirmation on the movie's exact placement in Stream's storyline. However, because of Dex and Dingo's appearance in the movie, it most likely occurs shortly after episode 22 in which the boys move to DenTech City, but not after episode 29 when elements from the movie begin appearing in the series, specifically those concerning Baryl and Colonel.

Notes

2004 Japanese television seasons
2005 Japanese television seasons
Stream